Michelle Trachtenberg (born October 11, 1985) is an American actress. Trachtenberg began her career at age three, appearing in a number of commercials, films, and television series as a child. Her starring role on the Nickelodeon television series The Adventures of Pete & Pete (1994–1996) as Nona Mecklenberg was also her first credited role. She starred in the Nickelodeon Movies comedy film Harriet the Spy (1996) as the film's eponymous character and in the CBS sitcom Meego (1997) as Maggie, both of which she won two Young Artist Awards for.

Trachtenberg found further success on the WB supernatural drama television series Buffy the Vampire Slayer (2000–2003) as Dawn Summers, the younger sister of the show's eponymous protagonist, a role which won her another Young Artist Award and earned her three Saturn Award nominations. She also earned a Daytime Emmy Award nomination for her role as the host of the Discovery Kids series Truth or Scare (2001–2003). During the mid-2000s, she had starring roles in the films EuroTrip (2004) and Ice Princess (2005) and supporting roles in the films Mysterious Skin (2004) and Black Christmas (2006). In the late 2000s and early 2010s, her recurring role on the CW teen drama television series Gossip Girl (2008–2012) as socialite Georgina Sparks earned her further popularity, and she also starred on the NBC television series Mercy (2009–2010) as Chloe Payne.

In the 2010s, Trachtenberg starred in several television films, including Killing Kennedy (2013) and Sister Cities (2015), and in the science fiction film The Scribbler (2014). She provided the lead voice of Judy in the Facebook Watch adult animated web series Human Kind Of (2018), and executive produced the teen drama web series Guidance (2015–2017) and the Tubi true crime television series Meet, Marry, Murder (2021–present), the latter of which she hosts as of 2022.

Early life
Trachtenberg was born on October 11, 1985 in New York City, the daughter of Jewish immigrants from Russia and Germany. Her grandparents reside in Israel, but she celebrates Christmas and "all" religions, having gone to a Catholic high school because, she said, its tuition fees were lower than those of the Jewish alternative. 

She was raised with her older sister, Irene, in Sheepshead Bay, Brooklyn, where she attended junior high school at The Bay Academy for the Arts and Sciences. She later attended Notre Dame High School in Sherman Oaks, California. She is fluent in Russian.

Career

Beginnings (1988–2003)
Trachtenberg made her first television appearance at the age of three, in a commercial for Wisk detergent. She went on to feature in over 100 more commercials. Her first television role was in the second season of Law & Order; her first credited role was as Nona F. Mecklenberg on the Nickelodeon series The Adventures of Pete & Pete from 1994 until 1996. During the same period she played Lily Montgomery on the soap opera All My Children.

Trachtenberg's film career began in 1996 with the title role in Harriet the Spy, for which she had to leave The Adventures of Pete & Pete while its third season was running. She then starred in the short-lived television series Meego, which garnered her a Young Artist Award. She returned to film in 1999 for Inspector Gadget. She also starred in the film Can't Be Heaven. In the summer of 2000, she took on the role of Dawn Summers in Buffy the Vampire Slayer, remaining in the role until the show ended in 2003. She also hosted the Discovery Kids series Truth or Scare from 2001 to 2003.

Rise to fame (2004–2007)

After Buffy and Truth or Scare, Trachtenberg appeared in the comedy film EuroTrip. She also had a recurring role in the HBO series Six Feet Under, as Celeste, a spoiled pop star for whom Keith Charles served as a bodyguard. In March 2005, she starred in Walt Disney Pictures' comedy sports drama film Ice Princess as Casey Carlyle, a science whiz, who is torn between a future in academia and her newfound dream of being a professional figure skater.

In 2004, Trachtenberg played Wendy in Gregg Araki's film adaptation of Scott Heim's novel, Mysterious Skin. Wendy is the best friend of Neil (Joseph Gordon Levitt), a teenage hustler in small-town Kansas. The film debuted at the 2004 Venice Film Festival.

In April 2006, Trachtenberg guest-starred in the episode of House, "Safe". She revealed on the December 22, 2006, episode of Late Night with Conan O'Brien that House was her favorite show, and that she was friends with one of the producers and had asked to be a guest star.

In November 2006, Trachtenberg guest starred in season six of the crime drama Law & Order: Criminal Intent. In the episode "Weeping Willow", she played the role of Willow, a kidnapped video blogger, likely based on lonelygirl15. Trachtenberg also appeared in the Fall Out Boy music video for "This Ain't a Scene, It's an Arms Race", the Joaquin Phoenix-directed music video for "Tired of Being Sorry" by Ringside, and the video for the Trapt song "Echo".

In 2006, Trachtenberg starred in Black Christmas, the remake of the 1974 slasher of the same name. In 2007, she was cast as the female lead in an ABC comedy pilot called The Hill, based on the newspaper of the same name in Washington, D.C.

2008–2010
Trachtenberg provided the voice of Tika Waylan for Dragonlance: Dragons of Autumn Twilight, a direct-to-video animated film based on the novel of the same name. She appeared on The CW hit show Gossip Girl, as Georgina Sparks, who recently left rehab and brings back the dark past Serena van der Woodsen desperately wants to leave behind. She returned to the show for a multiple-episode story arc towards the end of season two. Trachtenberg appeared in the season-three finale and in season four. She also appeared several times in season five, and in almost every episode of season six, the show's final season. In 2009, Trachtenberg was a cast member on the NBC drama Mercy; the series lasted one season. She returned to film with the 2009 film 17 Again. She also had a small role in the comedy film Cop Out.

2011–present
On June 9, 2011, Trachtenberg guest starred on Love Bites, as Jodie, who, after being unceremoniously dumped, decides – with a vengeance – to accept her ex's offer to "be friends". She reprised the role on June 16, 2011, and in the series finale on July 21, 2011. In the same year, Trachtenberg was a guest star on Weeds during its seventh season, portraying Emma, a rival pot dealer who causes problems for Silas Botwin. In June 2012, Trachtenberg was cast in the film The Scribbler, produced by Gabriel Cowan.

In the Criminal Minds episode "Zugzwang", Trachtenberg played Diane Turner, the criminal stalker to Spencer Reid's girlfriend, Maeve Donovan. In March 2011, she was the featured cover girl in Maxim.

In late 2015, Trachtenberg starred in the online series Guidance as Anna, the high school guidance counselor.

Filmography

Film

Television

Web series

Music videos

Awards and nominations

References

External links

 
 

1985 births
20th-century American actresses
21st-century American actresses
Actresses from New York City
American child actresses
American film actresses
American soap opera actresses
American television actresses
American voice actresses
American people of German-Jewish descent
American people of Russian-Jewish descent
Jewish American actresses
Living people
Notre Dame High School (Sherman Oaks, California) alumni
People from Sheepshead Bay, Brooklyn
21st-century American Jews